Lamellaria is a genus of small slug-like sea snails, marine gastropod molluscs in the family Velutinidae.

Species
Species within the genus Lamellaria include:
Lamellaria ampla Strebel, 1906
 Lamellaria australis Basedow, 1905
 Lamellaria berghi (Deshayes, 1863)
 Lamellaria branca Simone, 2004
 Lamellaria capensis (Bergh, 1907)
 Lamellaria cerebroides Hutton, 1883
 Lamellaria diegoensis Dall, 1885 - San Diego lamellaria
 Lamellaria digueti Rochebrune, 1895
 Lamellaria elata Strebel, 1906
 † Lamellaria falunica de Morgan, 1920 
 Lamellaria fernandinae Dall, 1927
 Lamellaria inflata (C.B. Adams, 1852)
 Lamellaria kiiensis Habe, 1944
 Lamellaria koto Schwengel, 1944
 Lamellaria latens (Müller, 1776)
 Lamellaria leptoconcha (Bergh, 1907)
 Lamellaria leucosphaera Schwengel, 1942 - white-ball lamellaria
 Lamellaria mopsicolor Ev. Marcus, 1958
 Lamellaria nodosa Ev. Marcus, 1987
 Lamellaria ophione Gray, 1850 
 Lamellaria orbiculata Dall, 1871
 Lamellaria patagonica E. A. Smith, 1881
 Lamellaria perspicua (Linnaeus, 1758) - transparent lamellaria
 Lamellaria punctata (Stimpson, 1855)
 Lamellaria setoensis Habe, 1944
Taxon inquirendum
 Lamellaria hyadesi Mabille & Rochebrune, 1889

Species brought into synonymy
 Lamellaria borealis (Bergh, 1886): synonym of Marseniella borealis Bergh, 1886
 Lamellaria cochinella L. Perry, 1940: synonym of Lamellaria perspicua (Linnaeus, 1758)
 Lamellaria conica E. A. Smith, 1902: synonym of Marseniopsis conica (E. A. Smith, 1902)
 Lamellaria courcellei Rochebrune & Mabille, 1889: synonym of Lamellaria patagonica E. A. Smith, 1881
 Lamellaria dozei Rochebrune & Mabille, 1889: synonym of Lamellaria ampla Strebel, 1906
 Lamellaria farrani Odhner, 1927: synonym of Calyptoconcha pellucida (A. E. Verrill, 1880)
 Lamellaria fuegoensis Strebel, 1906: synonym of Lamellaria patagonica E. A. Smith, 1881
 Lamellaria glacialis M. Sars, 1851: synonym of Onchidiopsis glacialis (M. Sars, 1851)
 Lamellaria gouldii A. E. Verrill, 1882: synonym of Calyptoconcha pellucida (A. E. Verrill, 1880)
 Lamellaria hyadesi Mabille & Rochebrune, 1889: synonym of Lamellaria perspicua (Linnaeus, 1758)
 Lamellaria incerta Bergh, 1898: synonym of Lamellaria perspicua (Linnaeus, 1758)
 Lamellaria kleciachi Brusina, 1866: synonym of Berthella plumula (Montagu, 1803)
 Lamellaria lata Jeffreys, 1867: synonym of Lamellaria latens (O. F. Müller, 1776)
 Lamellaria maculosa Bergh, 1898: synonym of Lamellaria perspicua (Linnaeus, 1758)
 Lamellaria magellanica Strebel, 1906: synonym of Lamellaria patagonica E. A. Smith, 1881
 Lamellaria marginata Bergh, 1898: synonym of Lamellaria perspicua (Linnaeus, 1758)
 Lamellaria mauritiana Bergh, 1853: synonym of Coriocella nigra Blainville, 1824
 Lamellaria membranacea Montagu, 1815: synonym of Pleurobranchus membranaceus (Montagu, 1815)
 Lamellaria mollis E. A. Smith, 1902: synonym of Marseniopsis mollis (E. A. Smith, 1902)
 Lamellaria nigra (Blaiinville, 1824): synonym of Coriocella nigra Blainville, 1824
 Lamellaria obliqua Monterosato, 1878: synonym of Lamellaria perspicua (Linnaeus, 1758)
 Lamellaria pellucida Verrill, 1880 - translucent lamellaria: synonym of Calyptoconcha pellucida (A. E. Verrill, 1880)
 Lamellaria prodita Lovén, 1846: synonym of Marsenina glabra (Couthouy, 1838)
 Lamellaria rhombica Dall, 1871: synonym of Marsenina rhombica (Dall, 1871)
 Lamellaria rugosa Monterosato, 1878: synonym of Lamellaria perspicua (Linnaeus, 1758)
 Lamellaria sharonae Willett, 1939: synonym of Marseniopsis sharonae (Willett, 1939)
 Lamellaria spirolineata Monterosato, 1869: synonym of Lamellaria perspicua (Linnaeus, 1758)
 Lamellaria stearnsii (Dall, 1871): synonym of Marsenina stearnsii (Dall, 1871)
 Lamellaria tentaculata Montagu, 1815: synonym of Lamellaria latens (O. F. Müller, 1776)
 Lamellaria tenuis Monterosato, 1878: synonym of Lamellaria perspicua (Linnaeus, 1758)
 Lamellaria tongana (Quoy & Gaimard, 1832): synonym of Coriocella tongana (Quoy & Gaimard, 1832)
 Lamellaria uchidai Habe, 1958: synonym of Marsenina uchidai (Habe, 1958)
 Lamellaria wilsonae E. A. Smith, 1886: synonym of Mysticoncha wilsonae (E. A. Smith, 1886)
Taxon inquirendum
 Lamellaria hyadesi Mabille & Rochebrune, 1889

Secondary metabolites
They are the source of Lamellarin D, found by Steiner et al. 2015 and Borjan et al. 2015 to a cytotoxin.

References

 
 Vayssière A. (1912). Recherches zoologiques et anatomiques sur les Opisthobranches de la Mer Rouge et du Golfe d'Aden. Deuxième Partie. Annales de la Faculté des Sciences de l'Université de Marseille. 20, Supplement: 5–157.
 Powell A. W. B., New Zealand Mollusca, William Collins Publishers Ltd, Auckland, New Zealand 1979 
 Gofas, S.; Le Renard, J.; Bouchet, P. (2001). Mollusca, in: Costello, M.J. et al. (Ed.) (2001). European register of marine species: a check-list of the marine species in Europe and a bibliography of guides to their identification. Collection Patrimoines Naturels, 50: pp. 180–213
 Spencer, H.; Marshall. B. (2009). All Mollusca except Opisthobranchia. In: Gordon, D. (Ed.) (2009). New Zealand Inventory of Biodiversity. Volume One: Kingdom Animalia. 584 pp

Velutinidae
Gastropod genera